Grimsby is a town on Lake Ontario in the Niagara Region, Ontario, Canada. Grimsby is at the eastern end of the Hamilton Census Metropolitan Area. It is named after the English fishing town of Grimsby in north-east Lincolnshire. The majority of residents reside in the area bounded by Lake Ontario and the Niagara Escarpment, home to a section of the Bruce Trail.

Grimsby has experienced significant growth over the past two decades due to its position between Hamilton and St. Catharines. Growth is limited by the natural boundaries of Lake Ontario and the Niagara Escarpment. Some residents feel development is detrimental to the town as orchards close to the town centre are used for residential development; however, most of the orchards in Grimsby were replaced by houses between the 1950s and 1980s and very few orchards remain.

According to a late 2019 report, the town has 33 small parks, 17 larger and "many more green spaces, sport fields, parkettes, trails, and facilities". Some notable attractions in Grimsby are the Grimsby Museum, the Grimsby Public Library, the Grimsby Public Art Gallery, the West Niagara YMCA, the Danish Church, and the hockey arena (Peach King Centre), home of the Grimsby Peach Kings.

History

A group of United Empire Loyalists from Great Britain settled on the land (originally named Township Number 6 and then 'The Forty'), and founded Grimsby in 1790. Robert Nelles, a politician and later lieutenant-colonel in the War of 1812, was one of the town's founders. His home on Main Street West was used for many planning sessions during the war. In 1816 the settlement became known as Grimsby, the name of the surrounding township, in memory of the seaport town of Grimsby in North East Lincolnshire, England.

The Village of Grimsby was officially incorporated in 1876 and became a town in 1922. The community has gone through many changes, from being a small rural village; to a centre for the manufacture of farm machinery, hospital furniture, furnaces and other metal products; and later the hub of the Niagara Peninsula's fruit-growing industry. Grimsby also had a successful fishing industry which lasted until the 1960s. The Town of Grimsby and the Township of North Grimsby were amalgamated in 1970 with the formation of the Regional Municipality of Niagara. With a number of wineries and distilleries, Grimsby now serves as the starting point for touring the Niagara wine region.

Canada's first Chautauqua-like organization (a Methodist camp) was established in 1859 in Grimsby Park on land donated by  J.B. Bowslaugh; colourful cottages were later built and some visitors spent entire summers in the area. Two hotels and a temple were also built. Over 50,000 visited in 1884 but by 1900 interest had declined. By 1909 the Grimsby Park Company was bankrupt and the property was sold for use as an amusement park. The temple and hotels were destroyed in the 1920s. In 1910, the amusement park's first owner, Harry Wylie, added carousels, a motion picture theater, and a roller coaster. Canada Steamship Lines bought out the business in 1916, but the park declined through the 1920s, mainly due to multiple fires that consumed many of the wooden buildings. Operation had ceased by 1950 and the land was sold to developers who built cottages. Many of the colourful cottages were destroyed by fire or demolished over the years. As of 2019, Grimsby Pier, where ferries and steamships had once docked, was in a state of disrepair; the mayor said he hoped that it could be restored.

In 2011, Grimsby was struck by an F0 Tornado.

Grimsby is also the birthplace of a Hollywood director, Del Lord. He rose to acclaim as the director of most of the Three Stooges short vaudeville comedies. Later, under Columbia Pictures, he also directed nearly 200 feature films.

Local government

Grimsby Town Council is composed of a Mayor and eight Councillors who serve for a term of four years. The Mayor is elected at large and the Councillors are elected by ward. The town is divided into four wards with two Councillors elected in each ward. It is the role of Council to represent the public and to consider the well-being and interests of the municipality; to develop and evaluate policies and programs; to determine which services the municipality provides; to ensure administrative practices and procedures are in place to implement the decisions of Council; and to maintain the financial integrity of the municipality. The Council generally meets on the first and third Mondays of each month. All meetings are open to the public and are also televised live on the local Government-access television (GATV) cable TV channel.

The current council (2018-2022 term) was sworn in on December 3, 2018, with the following members:

Mayor
Jeff A. Jordan

Town Council Members Ward 1
Councillor Reg Freake
Councillor Delight Davoli

Town Council Members Ward 2
Councillor Brian Howe
Councillor Lianne Vardy

Town Council Members Ward 3
Councillor Veronica Charrois
Councillor Jennifer Korstanje

Town Council Members Ward 4
Councillor Nick DiFlavio
Councillor Jacob Baradziej

Source:

The Regional Municipality of Niagara is an upper-tier municipality that encompasses all municipalities in Niagara Region. On Niagara Regional Council, Grimsby is represented by the Mayor and by an elected Regional Councillor, currently Wayne Fertich.

Standing Committees

Council has appointed four standing Committees as follows:
Administration and Finance Committee (4 Councillors and Mayor) - Main functions are current and capital budget preparation and administration; personnel policies and compensation plans; financial matters; general administrative matters; public relations; fire matters; cemetery administration; school crossing guards; canine control.  The administration, treasury and fire departments report to council through this committee, as well as the library, art gallery and museum for budget purposes. 
Planning and Development Committee (4 Councillors, 3 Citizen Appointees and Mayor) - Main functions are land use planning, economic development and promotion and building inspection. The planning and building departments report to council through this committee. 
Public Works Committee (4 Councillors and Mayor) - Main functions are storm drainage, sidewalks, roads, street lighting, water distribution, sanitary sewers, solid waste management, cemetery maintenance, parking and traffic control. The public works department reports to council through this committee. 
Recreation Services Committee (4 Councillors, 3 Citizen Appointees and mayor) - Main functions are parks, community and recreation services and programming. The recreation, facilities & culture department reports to council through this committee, as well as the art gallery, library and museum.

Transportation
Bisecting the town is the Queen Elizabeth Way, one of the 400-series highways. It has three interchanges in the town, with Casablanca Boulevard in the west, a central interchange for three roads (Christie Street, Ontario Street, and Maple Avenue), and Bartlett Avenue in the east.

The Grimsby railway station, on the south side of the railway tracks west of Ontario Street and south of Queen Elizabeth Way, is served by the Maple Leaf train jointly operated by Via Rail and Amtrak. A GO Transit train station is planned for operation on the Lakeshore West line, was expected to open in 2021 as part of the Lakeshore West Line, and was halted as of late 2018. Of three sites for the Grimsby GO Station evaluated by Metrolinx, the Crown agency that operates GO Transit, the preferred site for the proposed station is west of and adjacent to Casablanca Boulevard.

In August 2020, Niagara Region Transit launched a two-year pilot to provide on-demand local and regional transit service for Grimsby and other nearby communities.

Schools

Secondary schools
West Niagara Secondary School (operated by DSBN)
Blessed Trinity Catholic Secondary School (operated by NCDSB)

Primary schools
Central French Immersion Public School
Grand Ave. Public School
Lakeview Public School
Nelles Public School
Our Lady of Fatima Catholic School
Park Public School
Smith Public School
St. Joseph Catholic School

Churches

Centennial Park Baptist Church (1876) 
Christ Our Saviour Lutheran
Church of Christ
Covenant Canadian Reformed Church
The Danish Lutheran Church (1958-2018) 
Forestview Community Church
Jehovah's Witness Kingdom Hall
Lakemount Worship Centre
Lincoln Pioneer Seventh-day Adventist Church
Living Light Canadian Reformed Church
Mountainview Christian Reformed Church
New Apostolic Church
New Life Community Church
Park Rd. United Church
Spiritual Assembly of the Baháʼís of Grimsby
St. Andrew's Anglican (1825), the third church on this site, features a churchyard containing graves of many early settlers (c. 1785-) at The Forty, as Grimsby was originally called.
St. George's Ukrainian Orthodox
St. John's Presbyterian
St. Joseph's Roman Catholic
St. Mary's Ukrainian Catholic
St. Philip By-The-Lake Anglican
Trinity United Church

Grimsby Public Library

The first library in Grimsby was opened in 1871 in the home of Grimsby councillor Sam Mabey, housing a collection of 1,000 books. Following a recommendation of the town council, the village struck a committee to approach the Andrew Carnegie Foundation to request new funds to build a new library. The foundation allocated $8,000 to build the new library building.
In 1975, the library was expanded to include a new building, which inaugurated a Grimsby Public Art Gallery in the basement of the library. A few years later, the Klosso Eloul sculpture 'Double is One' was installed on the grounds.
In 2004, a new building was constructed adjacent to the original structure to house both the library and art gallery. The original structure itself contains the Grimsby Archives.

Grimsby Beach
Grimsby beach is home to "Gingerbread Houses"  that are painted by owners in bright colours and flourishes for an eye-catching addition to the area.

Demographics

Notable people

Climate
Grimsby's climate varies throughout the year; 12 °C – 15 °C in the spring, 21 °C – 33 °C in the summer, and 10 °C – 17 °C in the fall. Temperatures in the winter months are around  4 °C to −16 °C, with about 190 cm of snow per year.

See also
List of townships in Ontario

References

External links

 
Lower-tier municipalities in Ontario
Populated places established in 1790
Towns in Ontario
1790 establishments in the British Empire